James Bowie High School is a public high school in Arlington, Texas. The school is a part of Arlington Independent School District and serves students in grades 9 through 12 in southeast Arlington and southwest Grand Prairie. Bowie High competes in Class 6A within the University Interscholastic League that governs interschool athletic, artistic, and academic competition in Texas.

History

The Original Bowie High School

The original Bowie High School opened in 1973, relieving Sam Houston High School. The original Bowie, AISD's fourth high school, was located three blocks west and two blocks south of Sam Houston. Cathy Brown of The Dallas Morning News wrote "Bowie, in its first incarnation.bargain.n, are too close together to effectively serve the city's population. So community, be warned." Many students in the Houston zone wanted to transfer to Bowie because it was newer, and the transfer process made it easy for them to do so.

Martin High School opened in 1982, and the growth patterns in southern Arlington changed, so the district choose to close the original Bowie the following year. As of that year, the original building is now Workman Junior High School.

Current building 
In 1991, Bowie reopened and moved to its current building on Highbank Drive.

Feeder patterns 
Bryant, Farrell, Starrett, West, and portions of Beckham and Remynse Elementaries feed into Barnett Jr. High. Barnett sends all of its students to BHS. Foster Elementary sends a portion of its population to Gunn Jr. High. Gunn sends the majority of its students to BHS and the rest goes to Arlington. Fitzgerald Elementary feeds into Ousley Jr. High. Ousley sends a small portion of its population to BHS. Burgin Elementary feeds into Workman Jr. High. Workman sends the majority of its students to BHS and the rest goes to Sam Houston.

Academics
In May 2006, Bowie High School joined the International Baccalaureate program. The Class of 2008 was the first class offered the opportunity to earn the IB Diploma.

The school participates in the Advanced Placement Program, offering the following Advanced Placement (AP) classes: AP Art: Studio Drawing, AP Art: Studio 2-D Design, AP Biology, AP Calculus AB/BC, AP Chemistry, AP Computer Science, AP English, AP English Language and Composition, AP English Literature and Composition, AP Environmental Science, AP European History, AP French, AP Geography, AP Government, AP Government and Politics, AP Latin, AP Macroeconomics, AP Physics C: Mechanics, AP Psychology, AP Spanish, AP Statistics, AP US History and AP World History.

Dual credit courses, taken at Tarrant County College (SE Campus) and/or UT Arlington, are offered in Algebra II, Art IV, English IV, Geology, Government/Economics, Music History, Psychology and Sociology.

Notable alumni
Vincent Paul Abbott - Also known as "Vinnie Paul", of Hard-Rock Band Pantera.
Darrell Lance Abbott, who went to Bowie a short time. Also known as "Diamond Darrell", "Dimebag Darrell", "Dimebag" or simply "Dime", of Hard-Rock Band Pantera.
Terry Glaze (Class of 1982) - Original lead Singer of the Heavy Metal band Pantera and Lead singer of MCA recording artist and 80's Hair Metal band Lord Tracy Lord Tracy album "Deaf Gods of Babylon" is number 50 on Rolling Stone Magazines 50 Greatest Hair Metal albums of all time.
Vernon Wells — Major League Baseball outfielder
Maren Morris - Country and pop music artist
Kamaru Usman — Former UFC Welterweight Champion
Ty Nsekhe (Class of 2005) — NFL offensive tackle
Russell Hansbrough (Class of 2012) - NFL running back
Kolby Listenbee - NFL wide receiver
Cade Cunningham - NBA point guard

References

External links

 James Bowie High School Official Web Site
 Arlington Independent School District Website

Arlington Independent School District high schools
Educational institutions established in 1973
1973 establishments in Texas
Educational institutions established in 1991
1991 establishments in Texas
High schools in Arlington, Texas
International Baccalaureate schools in Texas